Yearwood is a surname. Notable people with the surname include:

Barrington Yearwood (born 1986), Barbadian cricketer
Gilberto Yearwood (born 1956), retired Honduran football player
Kathleen Yearwood (born 1958), Canadian experimental singer-songwriter and author
Lennox Yearwood, minister, community activist, influential in Hip Hop political life
Richard Yearwood (born 1970), English-Canadian voice-over artist, director, producer, and character actor
Robin Yearwood, Antiguan politician and member of the Antigua Labour Party (ALP)
Trisha Yearwood (born 1964), American country music artist
Wayne Yearwood (born 1964), former professional and Olympic basketball player from Canada

See also
Earthwood, a brand of acoustic bass guitars
Erwood, a village in Powys, Wales
Harewood (surname)
Harwood (disambiguation)